The Marriage of Figaro (German: Figaros Hochzeit) is a 1920 German silent historical drama film directed by Max Mack and starring Alexander Moissi, Hella Moja and Eduard von Winterstein.

The film is based on the 1784 play of the same name by Beaumarchais.

Cast
Alexander Moissi as Figaro  
Hella Moja as Cherubino - Figaro's page  
Eduard von Winterstein as Count Almaviva  
Vera Schwarz as The Countess  
Johanna Mund as Susanna, chambermaid  
Guido Thielscher as Antonio - gardener 
Ilka Grüning as Marcelline  
Richard Treu as Dr. Bartholo  
Paul Graetz as Bassillo  
Claire Selo as Gardener's daughter

References

External links

German historical films
1920s historical films
Films of the Weimar Republic
Films directed by Max Mack
German silent feature films
German black-and-white films
Films based on The Marriage of Figaro (play)
German films based on plays
Terra Film films
1920s German films